Hyderabad is the capital and largest city of the Indian state of Telangana.

Hyderabad, or Hydrabad, may also refer to:

India
 Hyderabad district, India, a district in the state of Telangana
 Hyderabad State, a pre-1948 princely state ruled by the Nizam in south-central India
 Hyderabad State (1948–1956), a state of Union of India
 Hyderabad, Uttar Pradesh, a village in Uttar Pradesh
 Hyderabadi Muslims, Urdu speaking Muslims native to Hyderabad State
 Hyderabad Subah, an administrative division of the Mughal empire

Pakistan
 Hyderabad, Sindh, a city in the Pakistani province of Sindh
 Hyderabad District, Pakistan, a district in the province of Sindh
 Hyderabad Division, an administrative division within the province of Sindh
 Hyderabad Taluka (rural), an administrative subdivision of Hyderabad District
 Hyderabad City Taluka, an administrative subdivision of Hyderabad District comprising the capital and surrounding areas
 Hyderabad Colony a suburb of Gulshan Town, Karachi, Sindh, Pakistan
 Roman Catholic Diocese of Hyderabad in Pakistan

Ships
 , the only purpose built Q-ship of World War I launched in 1917 and sold in 1920
 , a  previously HMS Nettle launched in 1941 and sold in 1948
 Hyderabad (2004 ship), a bulk carrier sailing under the flag of Pakistan
 Hydrabad (1865 ship), an iron cargo and passenger sailing ship

Other uses
 Handley Page Hyderabad, Royal Air Force bomber of the 1920s

See also
 Heydarabad (disambiguation)
 Hyderabad District (disambiguation)